Gobioclinus dendriticus, the Bravo clinid, is a species of labrisomid blenny native to the Galapagos Islands and Malpelo Island. This species preys on small fishes and crustaceans. It can reach a length of  TL.

References

External links
Labrisomus dendriticus on the Smithsonian Tropical Research Institute
 

dendriticus
Galápagos Islands coastal fauna
Fish described in 1935
Taxa named by Earl Desmond Reid